Charles or Charlie Oliver may refer to:

 Charles Oliver (died 1706), Irish landowner and MP
 Charles Oliver (actor) (fl. 1936–1941), British actor
 Charles Nicholson Jewel Oliver (1848–1920), Australian sportsman and public servant
 Charles Silver Oliver, Irish landowner and MP
 Charlie Oliver (rugby union) (1905–1977), New Zealand rugby union player and cricketer
 Charlie Oliver (trade unionist) (1901–1990), Australian trade unionist and politician
 Charlie Oliver (English footballer) (born 1997), English footballer
 Charlie Oliver (Australian footballer) (1874–1917), Australian rules footballer
 Charlie Oliver (athlete) (born 1955), middle-distance athlete from the Solomon Islands

See also